Deo Nath Yadav is an Indian politician and member of the Samajwadi Party. Yadav was a member of the Bihar Legislative Assembly from the Phulparas constituency in Madhubani district.

References 

People from Madhubani district
Samajwadi Party politicians
Indian National Congress politicians from Bihar
Members of the Bihar Legislative Assembly
Living people
21st-century Indian politicians
Bihari politicians
Year of birth missing (living people)